Gegenes nostrodamus, commonly known as the dingy swift, light pygmy skipper, Mediterranean skipper or veloz de las rieras, is a butterfly belonging to the family Hesperiidae. It is found from the Mediterranean Sea, through Anatolia to Turkestan and India.

The length of the forewings is 15–16 mm. Adults are on wing from May to October in multiple generations.

The larvae feed on various grasses, including Gramineae, Aeluropus (in the Sinai Desert) and Aerulopus and Panicum species.

Description

Recorded from Campbellpore, Kala Pani and Hurripur, N.-W. India,(Butler).

References

External links
Butterflies of Bulgaria
Lepiforum
Moths and Butterflies of Europe and North Africa
Images
Butterfly Conservation Armenia

Hesperiinae
Butterflies described in 1793
Butterflies of Europe